Alexsandro Marques de Oliveira (born June 17, 1978) is a Brazilian former footballer.

Club statistics

References
jsgoal.jp

External links

 

1978 births
Living people
Brazilian footballers
Brazilian expatriate footballers
J2 League players
Ventforet Kofu players
Associação Atlética Ponte Preta players
Esporte Clube Santo André players
CR Vasco da Gama players
Associação Portuguesa de Desportos players
Villa Rio Esporte Clube players
Sport Club Barueri players
Jeju United FC players
K League 1 players
Expatriate footballers in Japan
Expatriate footballers in South Korea
Association football defenders
Sportspeople from Campinas